In the City may refer to:

Etymology
The rough English language translation of Istanbul, formerly Constantinople, the largest city in Turkey, derived from the Greek phrase "Eis tin polin" meaning "To the city" or "In the city".

Music
 In the City (The Jam album), 1977
 "In the City" (The Jam song), the title song
 In the City (Tavares album), 1975
 In the City (Kevin Rudolf album), or the title song
 In the City (Chromatics album), 2010
 "In the City" (Joe Walsh song), also recorded by the Eagles
 "In the City", a song by Bloom 06 from Crash Test 01
 "In the City", a song by Chromatics from In Shining Violence EP
 "In the City", a song by Good Shoes from Think Before You Speak
 "In the City", a song by Hanson from This Time Around
 "In the City", a song by Lauri Ylönen from New World
 "In the City", a song by Madness, the B-side from the single "Cardiac Arrest"
 "In the City", a song by Razorlight from Up All Night
 "In the City", a song by White Lion from Fight to Survive
 "In the City", a song by The Who, the B-side from the single "I'm a Boy"
 In the City (South African festival), an annual music festival that takes place in Johannesburg, South Africa

Other media
 In the City (video game), a game developed by Deadline Games
 In the City (film), a 2003 Spanish film 
 In the City (TV series), an Armenian comedy drama television series